"Compass" is a song recorded by American country music group Lady Antebellum. The song was written by members of the pop/R&B production team Stargate, and was produced by Nathan Chapman and Lady A. It was released as the third overall single from the group's fifth studio album, Golden, on October 1, 2013 by Capitol Records Nashville, and is included on the deluxe edition re-issue of the album, and it features lead vocals from both Scott and Kelley.

In 2015, the song was used in the E3 world reveal trailer for the upcoming 2016 theme park simulation video game "Planet Coaster", which is being developed by Frontier Developments.

Background and composition
After the May 2013 release of Golden, Lady A took a short break before returning to the studio to continue working on new music, rather than immediately going on tour to promote the album. The band came across the song "Compass" and felt so passionate about it that, despite not having a project to record it for and it coming from outside their Nashville comfort zone, they decided to record. "From the minute we first heard it," group member Hillary Scott explained to Billboard, "we believed in the message and the overall feel of the song. We knew we could put our own little overall spin on it. We had to have the fans hear it – immediately." Scott also elaborated on the sonic departure of the song from the group's previous recordings, stating that the prevalent banjo and fiddle in "Compass" were missing from their repertoire and country music as a whole, and credited the song with "reinvigorating" the band creatively and inspiring them to pursue new musical directions.

"Compass" is an uptempo song influenced by country music, folk music and bluegrass. It is composed in the key of C major, and features banjo and mandolin prominently.

Critical reception
Matt Bjorke of Roughstock described "Compass" as an "easily likable song" unlike anything else on country radio, with some of the best lyrics in recent country music releases and an "infectious, percussive and melodic melody". He also noted its potential to be the group's biggest crossover hit since "Need You Now". Taste of Country compared the bluegrass-inspired sound of the song to the music of Mumford and Sons, while praising "Compass" for being a "burst of positive energy... that relies on traditional country instruments" and suggested that the song could pave the way for bluegrass music's acceptance into the mainstream.

Music video
The music video was directed by Peter Zavadil and premiered in December 2013.

Chart performance
The song has sold 546,000 copies in the US as of April 2014.

Year-end charts

Certifications

Release history

References

2013 singles
Lady A songs
Capitol Records Nashville singles
2013 songs
Songs written by Mikkel Storleer Eriksen
Songs written by Tor Erik Hermansen
Songs written by Ammar Malik
Songs written by Emile Haynie
Song recordings produced by Nathan Chapman (record producer)
Music videos directed by Peter Zavadil
Songs written by Robopop
Songs written by Ross Golan